The Edersee Dam is a hydroelectric dam spanning the Eder river in northern Hesse, Germany.  Constructed between 1908 and 1914, it lies near the small town of Waldeck at the northern edge of the Kellerwald.  Breached by Allied bombs during World War II, it was rebuilt during the war, and today generates hydroelectric power and regulates water levels for shipping on the Weser river.

At low water in late summers of dry years the remnants of three villages (Asel, Bringhausen, and Berich) and a bridge across the original river bed submerged when the lake was filled in 1914 can be seen.  Descendants of those buried there go to visit the graves of their ancestors.

World War II

The dam was breached in World War II by bouncing bombs dropped by British Lancaster bombers of No. 617 Squadron RAF as part of Operation Chastise. By the time it diminished in the widening floodplains of the lower Eder, into the Fulda and into the Weser, a total of about 160 cubic meters per hectare had flowed, wreaking widespread destruction and claiming the lives of some 70 people.

(Some non-German sources erroneously cite an early total of 749 for all foreigners killed in all POW and labour camps downriver of the Möhne dam as casualties at a supposed POW or labour camp just below the Eder Dam.)

The dam was rebuilt within months by forced labour drawn from construction of the Atlantic Wall under command of Organisation Todt. The lake today is the third largest reservoir in Germany.  Its capacity of  makes it a major summertime recreational facility.

The 1955 film, The Dam Busters chronicled the British attack on the dam.

The Videogame Call of Duty from 2003, has a playable level of the dam.

See also
 List of hydroelectric power station failures
 Möhne Reservoir

References

External links 
 
 Interactive 360° panorama of Edersee dam

Geography of Hesse
Dams in Hesse
Dams completed in 1914
Hydroelectric power stations in Germany
Waldeck-Frankenberg
Dam failures in Europe